Dreva on Tweed (or simply Dreva) is a hamlet in the Scottish Borders. It was historically in Peebles-shire.

It is noted for the historical presence of a Peel tower.

Etymology

The name is first attested quite late, in 1649, as Draway. This seems to be a Cumbric name, perhaps cognate with Welsh (y) + tref + ma 'the place of the (fortified) farmstead'.

References

Villages in the Scottish Borders